Teaching Ethics is a peer-reviewed academic journal devoted to the philosophical examination of ethical issues in all disciplines. Its mission is to foster dialogue about ethics instruction across disciplinary boundaries, with a focus on business, medicine, technology, law, and other areas of liberal education. Notable contributors include Michael Davis, Deni Elliot, Mollie Painter-Morland, Lisa Newton, Louis Pojman, Wade Robison, and Holmes Rolston III. It is sponsored by the Society for Ethics Across the Curriculum and members receive the journal as a benefit of membership. Members of the American Association of Philosophy Teachers and the Philosophy Learning and Teaching Organization also have access to this journal. It is published by the Philosophy Documentation Center and has a SHERPA/RoMEO "green" self-archiving policy.

Indexing 
Teaching Ethics is abstracted and indexed in Academic Search, Education Research Complete, Philosopher's Index, PhilPapers, and TOC Premier.

See also 
 List of ethics journals
 List of philosophy journals

References

External links
 
 Society for Ethics Across the Curriculum

Biannual journals
Education journals
English-language journals
Ethics journals
Philosophy Documentation Center academic journals
Publications established in 2001